The Steyr Type VI was a series of grand tourer-style torpedo car, designed, developed and built by Austrian manufacturer Steyr, between 1923 and 1926. A sports racing version, known as the VI Klausen, was used in both Formula Libre and Grand Prix racing events.

References

Steyr
Grand tourers
Grand tourer racing cars
Cars of Austria
1920s cars
Cars introduced in 1923
Pre-war vehicles